KSOC (94.5 FM; La Raza 94.5 FM) is a terrestrial American radio station, licensed to Tipton, Oklahoma, United States, and is owned by the North Texas Radio Group, L.P.

References

External links
Official Website

SOC